Han-Noah Massengo (born 7 July 2001) is a French professional footballer who plays as a midfielder for  side Auxerre on loan from Championship side Bristol City.

Club career

Monaco
Massengo made his professional debut on 6 November 2018 in the UEFA Champions League group stage against Club Brugge replacing Youssef Aït Bennasser after 68 minutes in a 4–0 home loss. Hence, he became the first player born in the 21st century to play in the Champions League. He made his league debut on 11 November 2018 against Paris Saint-Germain.

Bristol City
Massengo joined Bristol City on 5 August 2019 for a reported fee of £7.2m signing a four-year contract with the club. Massengo was brought into the club for the departing skipper Marlon Pack, who would leave on deadline day for Cardiff City.

On 30 January 2023, Massengo joined Auxerre on loan for the remainder of the 2022–23 season.

International career
Born in France, Massengo is of Republic of the Congo descent. He is a youth international for France.

Career statistics

References

External links

AS Monaco profile
Bristol City FC profile

2001 births
French sportspeople of Republic of the Congo descent
People from Villepinte, Seine-Saint-Denis
Footballers from Seine-Saint-Denis
Black French sportspeople
Living people
French footballers
France youth international footballers
Association football midfielders
AS Monaco FC players
Bristol City F.C. players
AJ Auxerre players
Ligue 1 players
Championnat National 2 players
English Football League players
French expatriate footballers
Expatriate footballers in England
French expatriate sportspeople in England